Bose has sold aviation headsets since 1989 and consumer headphones since 2000. The current range of headphones/headsets consists of over-ear, in-ear, aviation and military models.

Over-ear headphones 
Development of the company's noise cancelling headphones (and first over-ear headphones) began in 1978 when the chairman, Amar Bose, tried a set of airline-supplied headphones during a flight and found that engine noise from the aircraft prevented the music from being enjoyed.

In 1986, Bose and Sennheiser both presented active noise cancelling headsets for aircraft pilots, with the Sennheiser design appearing in a  paper and the Bose design appearing in an ASME paper. A prototype Bose product was used to prevent hearing loss in pilots during the first non-stop around-the-world flight in the Rutan Voyager. The company was the first to release active noise cancelling headphones as a consumer product.

Wireless

QuietComfort 35 II 
In 2017, Bose released an updated model known as the QuietComfort 35 II, which adds a customizable "action" button on the left ear cap. By default, it is mapped to activate the Google Assistant, making it the first headphones to integrate with the service.

The QC35 II was reviewed favourably for their noise cancellation, audio quality and comfort.

In July 2019, users began to report that a firmware update to the QC35 II had inhibited the performance of the noise cancellation features. Bose stated that it had not made any changes to noise cancellation functions in their firmware. Some users performed firmware downgrades, but Bose later prevented this for security reasons. In October 2019, as part of an investigation, Bose began to allow owners within a "reasonable" proximity to the company's headquarters in Framingham, Massachusetts, to request a visit by a technician.

In 2020, Bose released the Bose QC35 II Gaming, which adds a gaming mic.

Noise Cancelling Headphones 700 
In 2019, Bose released the Noise Cancelling Headphones 700, also known as the NCH 700, a new high-end product positioned above the QC 35.

The headphones feature a more contemporary design with a stainless steel band and are controlled using a mix of buttons and touch-sensitive areas on the cups. Unlike the QC 35, they do not fold in half, but their ear cups can rotate for storage. The embedded rechargeable battery is not replaceable which limits the lifespan of the headphones to the life of the battery. Bose promoted improvements to sound quality, noise cancellation and voice call quality over the QC 35. The NCH 700 can also connect to two devices simultaneously, and integrate with Amazon Alexa and Siri in addition to the Google Assistant.

QuietComfort 45 
In 2021, Bose released the Bose QuietComfort 45 headphones. In addition to adding USB-C support to the QuietComfort model, Bose also added a fourth external microphone to improve call quality and Bluetooth 5.1 to improve wireless range. The rechargeable battery is not replaceable.

Audio sunglasses Bluetooth headphones

The Bluetooth sunglasses were released in 2019 and come in two styles – Alto and Rondo. The sunglasses have open-ear audio, UVA/UVB protection, an integrated microphone, a Bluetooth range of 9 meters, and are also AR enabled. The battery can sustain up to 3.5 hours of streaming music playback and takes up to 2 hours to charge.

In-ear headphones

Wired

QuietComfort 20 
The "QuietComfort 20" (QC20) and QC20i in-ear headphones were released in 2015 and are the company's first in-ear noise cancelling headphones.

It received a 2014 Red Dot Design Award. Also, it received a CNET's Editors' Choice Award of 4.5/5 points for its active noise-cancelling.

The QC20 model is for Android, Windows and Blackberry devices, while the QC20i is designed for Apple devices and includes volume controls on the remote.

The earbuds are similar to the IE2 headphones. A button on the remote labelled "Aware Mode" reduces noise cancellation to let in ambient noise.

True wireless 
True wireless headphones have no cord to keep each bud connected to each other.

Noise-cancelling headphones

QuietComfort Earbuds 
The QuietComfort Earbuds (QC Earbuds) were released on 5 October 2020. The headset features improved noise-cancellation compared to the predecessor QuietComfort (QC) 20, coupled with a noise canceling microphone in the right headphone.

It received CNET's Editors' Choice Award or 8.4/10 points for its active noise-cancelling. It also received a PCMag Editors' Choice award in 2020 for the best in-ear active noise-cancellation.

Specifications:
 Earbuds
 Bluetooth 5.1
 IPX4
 Battery: 6 hours
 USB-C and Qi wireless charging supported carry case with inbuilt lithium iodine battery that can charge the earbuds two times.
 Ear tips: Included ear tip sizes: Small, medium, and large. The intermediate sizes extra-small, medium-small, and medium-large, may be bought separately.

With the proprietary Bose Music app, the QC Earbuds can be customized with touch control to increase/decrease volume by swiping the right in-ear headphone and battery status by double tapping the left in-ear headphone, and default noise cancelling mode when only one headphone is plugged into the ear. The settings are stored in the firmware of the headphones, so the app can be uninstalled once they have been configured. In September 2022, Bose has revealed its new QuietComfort Earbuds II.

QuietComfort Earbuds II 
QuietComfort Earbuds II were launched on 15 September 2022.
7
The QuietComfort Earbuds II headphones and ear tips are smaller and lighter than the original QuietComfort Earbuds counterparts that they replace.

Specifications:
 Earbuds
 Bluetooth 5.3
 IPX4
 USB-C supported carry case. The battery life is 6 hours and the USB-C supported carry case has an inbuilt lithium iodine battery can charge them three times.
 Ear tips and stability bands: The product is shipped with three pairs of ear tips (small, medium, and large), and three pairs of stability bands (size 1–3). However, intermediate size extra-small, and extra-large, for the ear tips, as well as size 0, and 4 for the stability bands, can be bought in an Alternate Sizing Kit.

Default firmware configuration since the predecessor (QuietComfort Earbuds):
 The touch controls are added to both earbuds, which makes it easier to remember them.
 The touch control volume is enabled.
 The Right Shortcut (as well as the Left Shortcut) cycles through active noise-cancelling modes instead of accessing the voice assistant.
 Play/Pause: Single tap.
 Skip to the next track: Double-tap an earbud.
 Skip to the previous track: Triple-tap an earbud.

Awards
 What Hi-Fi? Award 2022 as the 'Best wireless earbuds over £200'.
 CNET's Best Wireless Earbuds for 2022, as well as a CNET's Editors' Choice Award of 8.8/10 points.
 PCMag Editors' Choice award in 2022 for the best in-ear active noise-cancellation.

Noise masking

Sleepbuds 
The Sleepbuds were released in June 2018. They were discontinued in October 2019 due to battery issues.

Sleepbuds II 
The Sleepbuds II were released in October 2020. They are designed to help wearers fall asleep faster by combining passive noise cancelling with silicone ear-tips, along with streamed audio in the form of soundscapess, ambient music, and white noise. The battery life is 16 hours and the USB-C supported carry case has a built-in lithium iodine battery that allows for three recharges.

The Sleepbuds II are dependent on the proprietary Bose Sleep app for Android or iOS, which provides ambient sounds and an alarm clock. However, some users might find it inconvenient that it is required to manually synchronize the Bose Sleep app with events from other apps to not miss them, as the smartphone speaker will be masked by the headphones that only allow audio permission from the Bose Sleep.

Sleepbuds II can be used as a tinnitus masker. Despite the very small size of the headphones, they may cause pressure pain on the ear for side-sleepers.

Aviation headsets

A20 Aviation Headset
The "A20 Aviation Headset" was released in 2010 as the successor to the "Aviation Headset X" (aka A10). It has a claimed battery life of 45 hours (using two AA batteries) or can be powered by the airplane's electrical system. There are two versions, one with Bluetooth and one without.

An updated version of the A20 was released in 2015.

Combat Vehicle Crewman Headset
A "Combat Vehicle Crewman Headset" was released in 1998, for use in armoured vehicles.

Triport Tactical Headset
A "Triport Tactical Headset" (TTH) was released in 2004. It is designed for use in armoured vehicles and can fit under an infantry ballistic helmet. An updated version was released in 2012.

Required software

Bose music
Bose Music is a proprietary mobile app that is required by products including the QuietComfort Earbuds-series (QuietComfort Earbuds II, QuietComfort Earbuds).

Android
The Bose Music app in Android requires:
 Registration (email and password) and login.
 Bluetooth Low Energy (LBE), which requires Location Permission in Android 6 and above.

References

Headphones
Headphones
Lists of products